Kiribathgoda is a suburb of Gampaha and is situated on A1 highway, between Kelaniya and Kadawatha. It is the first commercial E-Suburb in Sri Lanka. The suburb is located 12 km away from Colombo Fort centre. It is also linked to Makola by road. 

Sinhalese ethnicity is the largest demographic in Kiribathgoda with a majority of Sinhalese belonging to Buddhism, and a significant minority belonging to Christianity  (majority; Catholicism). There are a multitudinous number of Buddhist temples spread throughout Kiribathgoda and a Catholic church in the outskirts of Kiribathgoda.

Education 
The University of Kelaniya is one of the main state universities of Sri Lanka is situated just near the Kiribathgoda city. There are a number of schools in the Kiribathgoda town, such as Viharamahadeavi Balika Vidyalaya, Ramasinghe Vidyalaya, and the Eureka International School

References

Populated places in Western Province, Sri Lanka